Monteroduni is a comune (municipality) in the Province of Isernia in the Italian region Molise, located about  west of Campobasso and about  southwest of Isernia.

The town's name derives from the ancient one of the river Volturno, Olotrunus. Sights include the Pignatelli Castle, built by the Lomards in the 9th century and later enlarged under the D'Evoli family.

Monteroduni borders the following municipalities: Capriati a Volturno, Colli a Volturno, Gallo Matese, Longano, Macchia d'Isernia, Montaquila, Pozzilli, Sant'Agapito.

See also
Ad Rotas

References

External links
 Official website

Cities and towns in Molise